The 2021–22 season was Cheltenham Town's 135th year in their history and first season back in League One since the 2008–09 season following promotion last season. Along with the league, the club also competed in the FA Cup, the EFL Cup and the EFL Trophy. The season covers the period from 1 July 2021 to 30 June 2022.

Pre-season friendlies
Cheltenham Town announced they would play friendlies against Cinderford Town, Evesham United, Birmingham City, Kidderminster Harriers, Coventry City, Hungerford Town, Hereford and Walsall as part of their pre-season preparations.

Competitions

League One

League table

Results summary

Results by matchday

Matches
Cheltenham Town's fixtures were announced on 24 June 2021.

FA Cup

Cheltenham were drawn away to Gillingham in the first round and AFC Wimbledon in the second round.

EFL Cup

Cheltenham Town were drawn away to Bristol Rovers in the first round, Gillingham in the second round and Preston North End in the third round.

EFL Trophy

Cheltenham were drawn into Group E in the Southern section, alongside Bristol Rovers, Chelsea U21s and Exeter City.

Transfers

Transfers in

Loans in

Loans out

Transfers out

References

Cheltenham Town
Cheltenham Town F.C. seasons